Adolfo Rincón de Arellano Garcia (1910–2006) was a Spanish politician.

1910 births
2006 deaths
People from Valencia
University of Valencia alumni
Politicians from the Valencian Community